The World Schools Rugby Festival is an international rugby union tournament for 15-a-side youth teams. Participation is through invitation with the aim of having the top youth rugby teams in the world compete in a Ryder Cup style format with 10 teams from South Africa and 10 teams from the Rest of the World.

History
The originator of the idea of a World Schools festival was former Springbok coach Heyneke Meyer who upon joining a Hong Kong based sports marketing firm as Managing Director made arranging the tournament his priority. After initially focusing on the George area Meyer was approached by parties suggesting the festival be held at Paarl Boys to celebrate their 150th birthday celebrations.

2018 tournament
The 2018 tournament was held in Paarl, South Africa in celebration of Paarl Boys High's 150th anniversary.

Participating teams

Results

Final standings

2019 tournament
The 2019 tournament was held in Stellenbosch, South Africa at Paul Roos.

Participating teams

Results

Final standings

2020 tournament
The 2020 tournament was to be held in Pretoria, South Africa at Affies in celebration of their centenary year. The festival was cancelled due to the COVID-19 pandemic.

Participating teams
Before the tournament was cancelled 19 teams had committed: 10 from South Africa and 9 from the rest of the world contingent.

See also
Rugby union in South Africa

References

External links
Official website

International rugby union competitions hosted by South Africa
High school rugby union